The Arisaka rifle is a family of Japanese military bolt-action service rifles, which were produced and used since approximately 1897, when it replaced the Murata rifle family, until the end of World War II in 1945. The most common models include the Type 38 chambered for the 6.5×50mmSR Type 38 cartridge, and the Type 99 chambered for the 7.7×58mm Type 99 cartridge, which is comparable in power to a modern .308 Winchester round.

History

The Arisaka rifle was designed by Colonel Arisaka Nariakira (1852–1915), who was later promoted to lieutenant general and also received the title of baron from Emperor Meiji, in 1907. Over the course of various wars several productions runs and variants were made, including the transition from the 6.5mm Type 38 cartridge to the larger 7.7mm Type 99, and the introduction of a paratrooper rifle that could be disassembled into two major parts for airborne operations. Tests on samples of Arisaka rifles conducted after the war showed that their bolts and receivers were constructed of carbon steel "similar to SAE steel grade No. 1085 with a carbon content of 0.80% to 0.90%, and a manganese content of 0.60% to 0.90%." During destructive tests, the Arisakas were shown to be stronger than the M1903 Springfield, Lee–Enfield, and Mauser rifles. The Arisakas were also one of the only guns of the era to use polygonal rifling in its barrels, rather than the more traditional lands and grooves.

Some of the early issue Type 99 rifles were fitted with a folding wire monopod intended to improve accuracy in the prone position. The rear sights also featured folding horizontal extensions to give a degree of lead suitable for firing against aircraft. Near the end of World War II, last-ditch ersatz models were being made in various cost-cutting feature variations with the goal of cheaply bolstering the imperial armed forces; for example, the ovoid bulb-shaped bolt of earlier runs were replaced by a smaller and utilitarian cylindrical shape, the handguard on the barrel was omitted, and crude fixed sights were fitted.

The Arisaka bolt-action service rifle was used everywhere in the Imperial Japanese Army and the Imperial Japanese Navy. Prior to World War II, Arisakas were used by the British Navy and Russian Army, in Finland and Albania. The Czech Legions that fought in the Russian Revolution were almost entirely armed with Type 30s and 38s. Many captured Arisaka rifles were employed by neighboring countries both during and after World War II, in places such as China, Thailand and Cambodia. However, after the Japanese surrender in the summer of 1945, manufacture of rifles and ammunition stopped abruptly, and the Arisaka quickly became obsolete. Since most Imperial Japanese Armory contents were thrown into Tokyo Harbor after the signing of the surrender, spare ammunition also became rare. Additional 6.5×50mmSR and 7.7×58mm ammunition was, however, produced in China for use in their captured rifles.

The imperial ownership seal, a 16-petal chrysanthemum known as the Chrysanthemum Flower Seal stamped upon the top of the receiver in all official imperial-issue rifles, has often been defaced by filing, grinding, or stamping on surviving examples. There are conflicting claims that this was done on the orders of the Imperial Japanese Military prior to surrender, however it is generally accepted by most historians that the imperial chrysanthemums were ground off the rifles on the orders from General Douglas MacArthur, the commander of occupation forces at that time.  To date, no documentation from either Japanese or U.S. forces has been found that required the defacing. Most of the Arisakas with surviving insignia are in Japan, though there are a few remaining on samples taken as war trophies before the surrender, and those captured by Chinese forces. Some of the captured Sino Arisakas were later exported to the United States, examples including a number of Type 38 carbines and Type 44 carbines rebarrelled and rechambered for the 7.62×39mm round. Some Type 38 rifles and Type 99 rifles captured by the Kuomintang forces were also converted to fire the 7.92×57mm Mauser round.

Many of the Chrysanthemum Seals were completely ground off, but some were merely defaced with a chisel, scratch or had the number "0" stamped repeatedly along the edges. The latter was usually done with rifles removed from Japanese military service (and thus no longer the emperor's property), including rifles given to schools or sold to other nations, such as the British Royal Navy's purchase of many Type 38s in World War I to free up SMLE rifles for their land forces.

A very small run of Type 38 rifles was also manufactured for export to Mexico in 1910, with the Mexican coat of arms instead of the imperial chrysanthemum, though few arrived before the Mexican Revolution and the bulk remained in Japan until World War I, when they were sold to Imperial Russia.

Many thousands of Type 99s and other Arisaka variants were brought to the United States by Army soldiers and Marines as war trophies during and after World War II.

Models

Type 30

First rifle of the Arisaka series. Chambered in 6.5×50mmSR Type 30. 554,000 built.

Type 30 carbine
Carbine variant of the Type 30; 300 mm shorter. 45,000 built.

Type 35

Officially designated as Type 35 navy rifle. Also in 6.5×50mmSR Type 30.

Design overhaul based on the Type 30 for the Imperial Japanese Navy Land Forces by Major Nambu Kijirō. Changes include tangent type rear sight, separate sliding bolt cover (as opposed to simultaneously moving ones on all other types after) of the same type later used on the Siamese Mauser style rifle, hook safety replaced with a large knob cocking piece to protect from gases in case of a blown primer, larger bolt handle knob, improved bolt head, gas port in bolt body, and improved chamber configuration for better cartridge feeding.

Type 38

Developed by Major Nambu Kijirō. Chambered in 6.5×50mmSR Type 38, Type 30 cartridge is also usable. A short variant exists for ease of handling, its length is between the basic rifle and the carbine.

One of the most produced and commonly encountered model. Designed in 1905 and simultaneously produced until 1942 with 3,400,000 built.

Type 38 carbine

Carbine variant of the Type 38; 300 mm shorter. Also fielded by support personnel.

Type 44 carbine

Carbine derived from the Type 38 rifle. Chambered in 6.5×50mmSR Type 38, Type 30 cartridge is also usable. Distinguishing features are its folding spike bayonet and two-piece takedown cleaning rods concealed within the buttstock. Originally intended for the cavalry, also used by other support personnel.

Type 97 sniper rifle

One of the two main sniper rifles in imperial military service. Based on the Type 38 rifle. Chambered in 6.5×50mmSR Type 38, but more commonly used reduced charge cartridges associated with the Type 11 and 96 light machine guns for lighter recoil, reduced report, camouflaged muzzle flash, and overall accuracy. Uses factory-zeroed Type 97 telescopic sight (2.5X).

About 22,500 built.

Type 99

Successor to the Type 38 rifle. Chambered in 7.7×58mm Type 99, later rimless variants of the Type 92 and 97 cartridges also usable.

Designed in 1939, then produced and fielded from 1941 to 1945, the Type 99 was the most common Imperial Japanese service rifle of World War II and second most produced imperial rifle with 2,500,000 built. Significant changes are the improvement of the rear sight form transitioning from a V-notch type like those on a Type 38, to an aperture, the front sight blade was renewed to a triangular shape, chrome-lined barrels were used, and on earlier productions, the rear sight was equipped with anti-aircraft calipers.

Sub-variations included a long rifle (approximately only 38,000 made), and short rifle; former being 1258 mm in total and latter being 1118 mm. The short rifle also varied in quality from initial, intermediate, to last-ditch.

Type 99 sniper rifle

The other sniper rifle of the Imperial Japanese Military. Built on both the long and short models with the latter being higher in number. Chambered in 7.7×58mm Type 99, later rimless variants of the Type 92 and 97 cartridges also usable. The larger, more powerful caliber allowed the ballistics to be less affected by windage at the cost of stronger recoil. Two different types of scopes were issued to the rifles: the Type 97 2.5X telescopic scope, or the Type 99 4X telescopic scope. Later production of the Type 99 scope allowed for distance adjustment. Scopes were issued with their respective holsters and were often detached from the rifle and placed within them while advancing.

By doctrine, snipers of the imperial military were selected by their skill in marksmanship. The caliber of the rifle assigned to a sniper corresponded with the ammunition of the company he served under.

Production began in May 1942. Total number made is approximately 10,000.

TERA

A small series of takedown rifles produced for the imperial army paratroopers and imperial navy paratroopers. Only production model is the Type 2 based on the Type 99 short rifle; the rest are two proto-test types (Type 100 and Type 1). The Type 2 is chambered in 7.7×58mm Type 99, later rimless variants of the Type 92 and 97 cartridges also usable.

The Type 2 allowed for compact storage by breaking down to two pieces: the stock and action, and barrel and handguard.

About a total of 19,000 were produced from 1942 to 1944.

Bayonets

Type 30

Created simultaneously with the Type 30 rifle, this sword-type bayonet is compatible with all variants of the Arisaka rifle except for the Type 44 carbine. Twenty different variations exist, and is further categorized by early, mid, and late-war production phases. Also fixable on Type 96 and 99 light machine guns.

Type 35 bayonet
The Type 35 bayonet was a slightly modified Type 30 bayonet made specifically for the Type 35 rifle. The dimensions of the bayonet is almost exactly the same as the Type 30 bayonet. The only real difference between the two is the added addition of a sprung catch that hooks into the scabbard when not in use.

About 8,400,000 were made.

Type 44
Fixed permanently on the Type 44 carbine, this spike-type bayonet is foldable under the handguard and does not interfere with the barrel when deployed.

Type 2
With the long length of the Type 30 bayonet unfit for concealing within a paratrooper's personal equipment set, this knife-type bayonet was created to address this issue. Twenty centimetres shorter than a Type 30, its total length is 32.3 cm. Used primarily with the Type 2 TERA rifle or the Type 100 submachine gun by the Imperial Military Airborne Divisions.

About 25,000 were made.

Details

As with all captured foreign firearms they may be dangerous when fired, due to both the lower quality of the "last-ditch" rifles produced during the end-half of World War II, and to modifications performed by returning U.S. servicemen on those rifles. Ammunition for the Arisaka series, which were often battlefield pick-ups, or souvenirs, were not readily available after the end of the war. Consequently, many were rebored or rechambered for readily available calibers of that time. Additionally, some were occasionally rendered inoperable prior to being shipped home, or even potentially sabotaged. The manner in which rifles may have been demilled can include permanently damaging the receiver or removal of parts.

Type 38s in particular were commonly rechambered to 6.5×.257 Roberts, a wildcat cartridge made using the readily available .257 Roberts cases with the neck expanded to use 6.5mm bullets specific to the already existing barrel. Likewise, the Type 99 in 7.7×58mm were known to be converted to .30-06 Springfield, which is again of similar but not identical dimensions. While the .30-06 can be fired by lengthening the chamber of the rifle slightly (from 58 to 63mm), the 7.7mm case is slightly wider than the .30-06 and uses a slightly larger-diameter bullet, meaning a .30–06 cartridge case will swell slightly to fit the oversized chamber, and a standard .30-06 bullet with a .308 diameter will not provide a good fit to the .310–312 diameter rifling.

Those seeking ammunition for their Type 99 rifles often manufacture it by modifying .30–06 cases. The German 7.92×57mm Mauser cartridge may also be used with the proper .311 diameter bullet. The widely available British .303 bullets also provide a proper fit for the firearm's rifling. Norma currently manufactures stock 7.7×58mm ammunition, as well as making new brass available for reloaders. Hornady also produces new Arisaka ammunition in both 6.5mm and 7.7mm calibers. Since the base of the 7.7mm case is slightly larger than the .30-06 (thereby causing varying amounts of bulging in the reformed brass), some owners may find it preferable to use proper brass or new factory cartridges. Bullets and powder charges of surplus .303 British ammunition may also be loaded into proper 7.7×58mm cases to produce rifle cartridges with ballistics that are similar to the original Japanese military load.

Gallery

References
Honeycutt, Fred L. Jr and Anthony, Patt F. Military Rifles of Japan.  Fifth edition, 2006.  Julin Books, U.S.A. .

Hatcher, Julian, Major General, (U.S.A. Ret). Hatcher's Notebook. Stackpole Publishing, Harrisburg, PA U.S.A.; 1962. Library of Congress Number 62-12654.

External links
小銃 | 日本の武器兵器 Rifles | Japanese Weapons
Japanese Weapons | Rifles Shou-Jyu
JUNK YARD | 日本陸軍地上兵器 Japanese Army Land Weapons
25番 Number 25 | 武器庫 Armory
Carbines for Collectors | Arisaka Carbines and Rifles
Nambu World: Arisaka Rifles (Broken Link)
BANZAI
Markings on Japanese Arisaka Rifles and Bayonets of World War II

Bolt-action rifles of Japan
World War II infantry weapons of Japan
Rifles of Manchukuo